Wu Na (born 1974) is a female Chinese former international table tennis player.

Career 
She won a bronze medal at the 1995 World Table Tennis Championships in the women's doubles with Wang Chen. Two years later she won a gold medal in the mixed doubles with Liu Guoliang and bronze in the singles at the 1997 World Table Tennis Championships.

Personal life 
She is married to footballer Shang Yi and their son Shang Juncheng is a professional tennis player.

See also
 List of table tennis players

References

Table tennis players from Jiangsu
People from Zhenjiang
Living people
1974 births
Chinese female table tennis players
Asian Games medalists in table tennis
Table tennis players at the 1998 Asian Games
Medalists at the 1998 Asian Games
Asian Games gold medalists for China
World Table Tennis Championships medalists